The Texas State University Master of Fine Arts in Creative Writing is a three-year graduate program at Texas State University in San Marcos, Texas, USA. Fiction writer Doug Dorst is the current director of the program.

Texas State's MFA program ranked 45th out of 131 full-residency graduate writing programs in the Poets & Writers survey for the application year 2012, the final year the rankings were released. The program was also cited by The New York Times as having the vision "to build a program that might rival the famed Iowa Writers' Workshop."

As of Fall 2018, 90% of Texas State MFA students received full funding through a combination of scholarships and assistantships.

MFA students staff Porter House Review, the program's online literary journal. The publication features work by established and emerging writers from around the world. Working for the journal allows students to gain experience as editors, work with visiting instructors from across the publishing industry, and earn up to six credit hours for their work. Porter House Review was preceded as the program's literary journal by Front Porch Journal, which ran from 2006 to 2018.

Faculty 
Cyrus Cassells, Poetry
Doug Dorst, Fiction/Program Director
Jennifer duBois, Fiction
Tom Grimes, Fiction
Roger Jones, Poetry
Debra Monroe, Fiction
Tim O'Brien, Professor of Creative Writing
Cecily Parks, Poetry
Kathleen Peirce, Poetry
Steve Wilson, Poetry
Naomi Shihab Nye, Poetry

Endowed Chair in Creative Writing 
Each year, the Endowed Chair in Creative Writing teaches one graduate MFA workshop. The Chair holder also visits classes and gives two readings. MFA students may take a workshop with only one Endowed Chair holder.

National Book Award Winner Tim O'Brien held the Chair every other year from 2003 through 2012. Now, as Professor of Creative Writing, he teaches six MFA workshops annually. Every workshop is open to every student.

Endowed Chairs in Creative Writing:
Ai, 2002-2003
Tim O'Brien, 2003-2004
Barry Hannah, 2004-2005
Tim O'Brien, 2005-2006
Denis Johnson, 2006-2007
Tim O'Brien, 2007-2008
Li-Young Lee, 2008-2009
Tim O'Brien, 2009-2010
Robert Stone, 2010-2011
Tim O'Brien, 2011-2012
Cristina García, 2012-2014
Ben Fountain, 2014-2016
Karen Russell, 2016-2020
Téa Obreht, 2020-2021

Adjunct Thesis Faculty 
Texas State's adjunct thesis faculty is composed of nationally recognized writers who will read students' entire thesis manuscripts and then send written personal comments, offering one-to-one readings of the books students write during their time in the program.

Fiction faculty:

Rick Bass
Kevin Brockmeier
Maxine Chernoff
Catherine Chung
John Dufresne
Fernando Flores
Amy Hempel
Carol Maso
Nina McConigley
David McGlynn
Antonya Nelson
Idra Novey
Karen Olsson
Alberto Ríos
Elissa Schappell
Chaitali Sen
Bennett Sims
Natalia Sylvester
Esme Weijun Wang
Kevin Wilson

Poetry faculty:

Hala Alyan
Catherine Barnett
Jennifer Browne
Victoria Chang
Jennifer Chang
Heather Christle
Monica de la Torre
Natalie Diaz
Carolyn Forché
Laurie Ann Guerrero
Joanna Klink
Ada Limón
Alessandra Lynch
Khadijah Queen
Spencer Reece
Sam Sax
Charif Shanahan
Brian Turner
Monica Youn

Visiting Writers Series 

Since Fall 2016, Texas State's MFA Visiting Writers Series has hosted twenty esteemed writers. Among the writers are five Pulitzer Prize winners, five MacArthur Fellows, four National Book Award winners, eight Guggenheim Fellows, eight NEA Fellows, two LA Times Book Prize winners, one Man Booker Prize winner, seven NBCC Award finalists, three PEN/Faulkner Award finalists and two Stegner Fellows. On average, the Texas State visiting writers spend six hours more with the MFA students in comparison to any other MFA program around the country. The series are held on Thursdays at the Wittliff Collections in Texas State's Alkek Library, and on Fridays at the Katherine Anne Porter Literary Center in the nearby town of Kyle. The literary center is maintained by the MFA program, and was the childhood home of Pulitzer Prize and National Book Award winner Katherine Anne Porter. It was added to the National Register of Historic Places in 2006.

Writer-in-Residence 
Every spring, a writer-in-residence joins the MFA program for a series of readings, master classes, workshops, manuscript consultations, and other collaborative events.

The Spring 2019 writer-in-residence was Ada Limón.

Clark Prize 

The L.D. and LaVerne Harrell Clark Fiction Prize is a $25,000 award recognizing an exceptional recently-published book-length work of fiction. The Clark Fiction Prize is awarded annually by the Texas State University English Department.

Jim Shepard, The Book of Aron, 2016
Colson Whitehead, The Underground Railroad, 2017
Daniel Alarcón, The King is Always Above the People, 2018 
Rebecca Makkai, The Great Believers, 2019
Chia-Chia Lin, The Unpassing, 2020

References

External links
Texas State University MFA webpage

Texas State University